"Beautiful Love" is a song by the English singer-songwriter Julian Cope. It is the first single released in support of his 1991 album Peggy Suicide. The Beautiful Love e.p. includes four tracks - see sidebar.

Chart positions

References

1991 singles
Julian Cope songs
Songs written by Julian Cope
1991 songs
Island Records singles